Matisia coloradorum is a species of plant in the family Malvaceae. It is endemic to Ecuador.  Its natural habitats are subtropical or tropical moist lowland forests and subtropical or tropical moist montane forests. It is threatened by habitat loss.

References

coloradorum
Endemic flora of Ecuador
Endangered plants
Endangered biota of South America
Taxonomy articles created by Polbot